The men's middleweight event was part of the boxing programme at the 1936 Summer Olympics. The weight class was the third-heaviest contested, and allowed boxers of up to 160 pounds (72.6 kilograms). The competition was held from Tuesday, August 11, 1936, to Saturday, August 15, 1936. Nineteen boxers from 19 nations competed.

Medalists

Results

References

External links
 sports-reference.com
 Official Olympic Report
 

Middleweight